"Sugar" is the fifth and final single from American DJ Armand Van Helden's sixth album Nympho. It is written and sung by Jessy Moss.

Track listing
CD Single
 Sugar (Radio Edit) - 3:30
 Sugar (Original Club Mix) - 7:44
 Sugar (Paper Faces Remix) - 6:35
 Sugar (Paper Faces Dub) - 6:34
 Sugar (Cagedbaby's Sugar Baby Remix) - 8:30

Charts

Release history

References

2006 singles
2006 songs
Armand Van Helden songs
Songs written by Armand Van Helden